Events in the year 1988 in Pakistan.

Incumbents

Federal government 
President: Muhammad Zia-ul-Haq (until 17 August), Ghulam Ishaq Khan (starting 17 August)
Prime Minister: Muhammad Khan Junejo (until 29 May), Benazir Bhutto (starting 2 December)
Chief Justice: Mohammad Haleem

Governors 
Governor of Balochistan – Musa Khan 
Governor of Khyber Pakhtunkhwa – Fida Mohammad Khan (until 16 June); Amir Gulistan Janjua (starting 16 June)
Governor of Punjab – Sajjad Hussain Qureshi (until 9 December); Tikka Khan (starting 9 December) 
Governor of Sindh – 
 until 23 June: Ashraf W. Tabani
 23 June-12 September: Rahimuddin Khan
 starting 12 September: Qadeeruddin Ahmed

Events 
April – Ojhri Camp, The ammunition Depot located at ojhri camp Rawalpindi mysteriously exploded on 10 April 1988 at 1000 hrs. Rockets fired randomly in every direction, killing many people and destroying many houses the city of Rawalpindi.
May _  General Zia, attacked Shia Muslims of Gilgit Baltistan with support of terrorists.
August – General Zia, the U.S. ambassador and top Pakistan army officials die in mysterious air crash on 17 August. General Zia's death in 1988 ends an 11-year military rule.
November – Benazir Bhutto's PPP wins the general election.

Births
18 December – Imad Wasim, cricketer

Deaths
5 August – Arif Hussain Hussaini, leader of Pakistani Shia Muslims (b. 1946; assassinated)
7 September – Abdul Haq, Islamic scholar (b. 1912)

See also
1987 in Pakistan
Other events of 1988
1989 in Pakistan
Timeline of Pakistani history

References

 
1988 in Asia